Oconee County is a county located in the northeastern part of the U.S. state of Georgia. As of the 2020 census, the population was 41,799. The county seat is Watkinsville.

Oconee County is included in the Athens-Clarke County, GA Metropolitan Statistical Area.

History
The county's name derives from the Oconee, a Muskogean people of central Georgia. The name exists in several variations, including Ocone, Oconi, Ocony, and Ekwoni. Oconee County was created from the southwestern part of Clarke County in 1875 by the Georgia General Assembly. The new county was created to satisfy southwestern Clarke County residents' demand for their own county after the county seat was moved from Watkinsville to Athens by the General Assembly in 1872. It is named for the river flowing along part of its eastern border.

The county was ranked as the third-best rural county to live in by Progressive Farmer magazine in 2006.

Geography
The county is located in the Piedmont region of the state.

The entirety of Oconee County is located in the Upper Oconee River sub-basin of the Altamaha River basin.

Adjacent counties
 Clarke County (north)
 Oglethorpe County (east)
 Greene County (southeast)
 Morgan County (south)
 Walton County (west)
 Barrow County (northwest)

National protected area
 Oconee National Forest (part)

Transportation

Major highways

  U.S. Route 29
  U.S. Route 78
  U.S. Route 78 Business
  U.S. Route 129
  U.S. Route 129 Business
  U.S. Route 441
  U.S. Route 441 Business
  State Route 8
  State Route 10
  State Route 10 Loop
  State Route 15
  State Route 24
  State Route 24 Business
  State Route 53
  State Route 186
  State Route 316
  State Route 422

Pedestrians and cycling
The city has limited walkability options available. However, since 2017 plans are being discussed to develop a multi-use trail network.

Demographics

2020 census

As of the 2020 United States census, there were 41,799 people, 13,423 households, and 10,727 families residing in the county.

2010 census
As of the 2010 United States Census, there were 32,808 people, 11,622 households, and 9,346 families residing in the county. The racial makeup of the county was 88.4% white, 5.0% black or African American, 3.1% Asian, 0.1% American Indian, 2.0% from other races, and 1.4% from two or more races. Those of Hispanic or Latino origin made up 4.4% of the population. In terms of ancestry, 19.9% were English, 14.7% were American, 13.3% were Irish, and 12.2% were German.

Of the 11,622 households, 43.4% had children under the age of 18 living with them, 67.4% were married couples living together, 9.5% had a female householder with no husband present, 19.6% were non-families, and 16.3% of all households were made up of individuals. The average household size was 2.81 and the average family size was 3.16. The median age was 39.1 years.

The median income for a household in the county was $74,352 and the median income for a family was $85,371. Males had a median income of $57,303 versus $39,375 for females. The per capita income for the county was $34,271. About 6.3% of families and 7.4% of the population were below the poverty line, including 9.1% of those under age 18 and 8.4% of those age 65 or over.

In 2012, the Wisconsin Population Health Institute ranked Oconee County as one of the top 3 healthiest counties in Georgia.  The study ranked the county second in the state in "Overall Health Factors" and third in "Overall Health Outcomes."

Government

Oconee County is governed by a four-member Board of Commissioners, which holds legislative power. The Board is led by a separately-elected Chairman, who holds executive power.  The Board is vested with budget and taxing authority, ordinance making authority, and control of county property, roads and facilities.  The chairman and all members of the board are elected from at-large districts (called "posts") to staggered terms of four years.

The Chairman of the Board is the county's Chief Executive Officer who, in consultation with the Commissioners, appoints officers and staff as needed to administer the responsibilities of the Board.

The current members of the Board are:
 Chairman:  John Daniell
 Post 1: Mark Thomas
 Post 2: Chuck Horton
 Post 3: Amrey Harden
 Post 4: Mark Saxon

The judicial branch of government is administered through the Georgia court system as a part of the 10th Judicial District, Western Circuit.

Primary law enforcement services in the portion of the county outside the City of Watkinsville are provided by the Sheriff's office. (Law enforcement within the Watkinsville City Limits is the jurisdiction of the Watkinsville Police Department.) The office of Sheriff is an elected position; since 2020, the office has been held by James Hale.

Politics

Education

Oconee County School District 

The Oconee County School District provides education for grades pre-school to twelve and consists of six elementary schools, two middle schools, and two high schools. The district has 361 full-time teachers and over 5,615 students.

Private schools 
There are currently three private schools located in the county.  They are:
 Westminster Christian Academy
 Prince Avenue Christian School
 Athens Academy

Colleges and universities 

The University of North Georgia maintains a satellite campus near Watkinsville. It was a Gainesville State College campus until the 2012 merger of Gainesville State College with North Georgia College and State University.

The College of Athens (CoA) is a private Christian college that was established in 2012 near Watkinsville. CoA currently offers certificates, undergraduate, and graduate degrees in nine various major areas.

Media
There is one weekly-published newspaper in Oconee County: The Oconee Enterprise.

Cox Media Group also operates a radio broadcast facility on Tower Place in northeast Oconee County. Four radio stations are operated from this facility:
 WNGC 106.1 FM
 WGMG 102.1 FM (Magic 102.1)
 WPUP 100.1 FM (Power 100.1)
 WRFC 960 AM (The Ref)

Communities
 Bishop
 Bogart
 Farmington
 North High Shoals
 Watkinsville

Notable people
 Nathan Crawford Barnett, member of the Georgia House of Representatives and Georgia Secretary of State for more than 30 years.
 John Berry, country music singer
 Phil Campbell, farmer
 Colt Ford, country music singer and professional golfer
 Lottie Moon, Southern Baptist missionary who spend nearly 40 years working in China

See also

 National Register of Historic Places listings in Oconee County, Georgia
List of counties in Georgia

References

External links
 Oconee County Tourism Official Website

 
Georgia (U.S. state) counties
Georgia placenames of Native American origin
Athens – Clarke County metropolitan area
1875 establishments in Georgia (U.S. state)
Populated places established in 1875